The 49m stealth fast attack craft (Project-PB-049) are a class of locally made fast attack craft of the Myanmar Navy. Unlike the previous class of 5-series class fast attack craft, the design of the 49m stealth fast attack craft utilizes stealth technology.

History
The hull number 491 is the lead ship of this class, and it was completed in 2013. The second ship 492 was completed in 2019, and commissioned on 24 December 2020.

Design
The 492 is fitted with three waterjet propulsers. The hull design and armaments are slightly altered.

Ships of the class

References 

Fast attack craft
Ships of the Myanmar Navy
Ship classes built by Myanmar Navy
2013 ships